The athletics competition at the 1993 European Youth Summer Olympic Days was held from 5 to 8 July. The events took place in Valkenswaard, Netherlands. Boys and girls born 1976 or 1977 or later participated 24 track and field events, divided equally between the sexes with the exception of 2000 metres steeplechase and pole vault for boys but not girls.

Medal summary

Men

Women

References

Results
1993 European Youth Olympics. World Junior Athletics History. Retrieved on 2014-11-25.
European Youth Olympics. GBR Athletics. Retrieved on 2014-11-25.

1993 European Youth Summer Olympic Days
European Youth Summer Olympic Days
1993
International athletics competitions hosted by the Netherlands